Udod (Cyrillic: Удод) is a surname. Notable people with the surname include:

 Danylo Udod (born 2004), Ukrainian footballer
 Evgeniy Udod (born 1973), Ukrainian politician
 Mykhaylo Udod (born 1997), Ukrainian footballer

See also
 

East Slavic-language surnames